John Connor is a character in the Terminator films and television series.

John Connor may also refer to:

Government and politics
John Connor (Illinois politician)
John Connor (Irish politician) (born 1944), Irish politician
John T. Connor (1914–2000), American attorney, US Secretary of Commerce, 1965–1967
Johnny Connor (1899–1955), Irish politician

Sports
John Connor (baseball) (1861–1905), American baseball player
John Connor (footballer, born 1893), Huddersfield Town player
John Connor (footballer, born 1914), Bolton Wanderers and Tranmere Rovers player
John Connor (soccer) (born 1953), Scottish-born Canadian football (soccer) player

Other
John Connor (Australia), Australian attorney and business executive
John Connor (mariner) (1727–1758), mariner
John Connor (Medal of Honor) (1845–1907), American soldier and Medal of Honor recipient

Fictional characters
John Connor, a character in the Michael Crichton novel Rising Sun and the film adaptation
Johnny Connor (Coronation Street), fictional character from Coronation Street

See also

Jon Connor, American rapper
John Connors (disambiguation)
John O'Connor (disambiguation)
Jack Connor (disambiguation)
John Conner (disambiguation)